Hilaly (Urdu: هلالی; Arabic: الهلالي) is an Asian surname that may refer to
Aeshi Hilaly (born 1973), Tanzanian politician
Agha Hilaly (1911–2001), Pakistani diplomat
Ahmed Naguib el-Hilaly (1891–1958), Egyptian lawyer and educator 
Shamim Hilaly (born 1947), Pakistani actress
Taj El-Din Hilaly (born 1941), Australian Sunni Muslim leader
Zafar Hilaly (born 1942), Pakistani political analyst and diplomat

See also
Hilal
Hila (given name)
Madrasa Sirajul Uloom Hilali Sarai Sambhal

Arabic-language surnames
Urdu-language surnames